Očigrije (Serbian Cyrillic: Очигрије) is a village in the municipality of Bihac, Bosnia and Herzegovina.

Demographics 
According to the 2013 census, its population was 2, all Serbs.

References

Populated places in Bihać